Hysni is an Albanian masculine given name and may refer to:
Hysni Curri (died 1925), Kosovar-Albanian military figure and revolutionary
Hysni Kapo (1915–1979), Albanian military commander and politician
Hysni Krasniqi (born 1942), Albanian painter and graphic artist
Hysni Milloshi (1946–2012), Albanian politician and communist activist

Albanian masculine given names